Biezdrowo  is a village in the administrative district of Gmina Wronki, within Szamotuły County, Greater Poland Voivodeship, in west-central Poland. The village has a population of 416.

Shrine
There is a Church of Holy Cross and Saint Nicholas with a Venerated Crucifix from 15th or 16th century.

References

Biezdrowo